Lukáš Dvořák may refer to:

 Lukáš Dvořák (photographer) (born 1982), Czech photographer
 Lukáš Dvořák (footballer) (born 1984), Czech footballer